Aliona Bolsova and Andrea Gámiz were the defending champions but Gámiz chose to compete at the 2022 Montevideo Open instead. Bolsova partnered alongside Rebeka Masarova but lost in the quarterfinals to Irina Khromacheva and Iryna Shymanovich.

Cristina Bucșa and Ylena In-Albon won the title, defeating Khromacheva and Shymanovich in the final, 6–3, 6–2.

Seeds

Draw

Draw

References

External Links
Main Draw

Open Ciudad de Valencia - Doubles